The Sanctuary Music Arena was a 22,000 sq ft, 3,500 capacity music venue in Denbigh North, Milton Keynes in the UK, and most well known for its connection to the rave scene.

Origins
Originally intended for industrial use, the unit was built speculatively in 1990 but failed to find a tenant due to the early 1990s' recession. It was first used as a music venue by ESP Promotions to host their inaugural Dreamscape raves from December 1991, after ESP Promotions owner (the late Murray Beetson) had reached an agreement with the landlord for short-term event hire. Beetson had been looking for a larger venue after the success of his nights at Milwaukees nightclub, Bedfordshire.

Dreamscape
As it was never designed for this purpose, there were a number of licensing conditions to be met before the go ahead was given by the local authorities, one of which was the installation of additional fire exits at ESP's expense to cope with the planned 4,000 capacity. Due to the success of the four Dreamscape parties held at the venue from December 1991 to May 1992 (each party selling out in advance), entrepreneur Tony Rosenberg purchased the site and had it re-purposed into a dedicated music venue. After closing in the autumn of 1992 for the redevelopment work to take place, the venue reopened in December as The Sanctuary Music Arena and included dedicated toilet and bar facilities with an ancient Rome theme running throughout, as well as adding a second smaller dance arena upstairs.  Due to the redesign and additional features, the licensed capacity of the venue was reduced to 3,500 people.

Wider popularity

The venue became pivotal in the development of numerous underground electronic dance music genres, sub-genres and styles.

Owned by Tony Rosenberg, The Sanctuary played host to the UK's biggest dance music promoters of the time, including Dreamscape, Helter Skelter, Slammin Vinyl, Gatecrasher, Hardcore Heaven, Cream, Slinky, Uproar, Sidewinder, and Godskitchen. The venue attracted a national audience to its 12-hour all night events.

As well as rave events, several high-profile live music acts appeared at The Sanctuary, including The Cult, The Prodigy, Brand New Heavies, Gary Numan, and Paul Weller.

Starting with ESP's New Year's Eve 1994 Dreamscape event, promoters would occasionally use the adjacent "Rollers UK" roller skating rink as an extra dance arena in conjunction with The Sanctuary. Later still (early 2000s), event promoters Slammin' Vinyl also made use of the "Fastrack" go-karting arena (the third and final unit on the site), creating a 9,000 capacity multi-arena dance venue, one of the largest of its kind in the country.

Regulation
The close association of rave with drug culture resulted in the public entertainment licence of The Sanctuary being challenged several times. Generally the local council were supportive as were Thames Valley Police, with the owner working alongside the authorities introducing harm minimisation for "ravers" (including drinking water fountains and on-site paramedic teams with private ambulances) but with parallel strong policing trying to prevent the sale of illegal substances within the venue.

In 1997, through a police challenge to The Sanctuary licence, the owner sought the assistance of the then MP for Milton Keynes South Dr. Phyllis Starkey, bringing to the attention of the MP the issues of licensing and in particular, the need for regulated door and event security ("bouncers"). This subsequently led to Dr. Starkey's Private Members Bill to Parliament in 1998 which although unsuccessful, eventually persuaded the Government to introduce the Private Security Industry Act 2001, leading to the formation of the Security Industry Authority in 2003.

Closure
Due to plans to redevelop the area, the Sanctuary finally closed its doors on 10 July 2004 with rave promoter Slammin Vinyl hosting the final event. The Sanctuary (and surrounding buildings) were subsequently demolished to make way for a new IKEA store.

In September 2008, a flashmob event was organised on social networking resulting in a five-minute "rave" within the store.

Legacy
The Sanctuary was the subject of a January 2022 exhibition at the MK Gallery, celebrating 30 years of the venue.

See also
List of electronic dance music venues

References

Buildings and structures in Milton Keynes
Dance venues in England
Rave culture in the United Kingdom
Electronic dance music venues
Demolished buildings and structures in England